Judgment of the Hills is a 1927 American silent drama film directed by James Leo Meehan and starring Virginia Valli, Frankie Darro and Orville Caldwell. The film is set in the Cumberland Mountains of Kentucky during World War I.

Cast
 Virginia Valli as Margaret Dix 
 Frankie Darro as Tad Dennison 
 Orville Caldwell as Brant Dennison 
 Frank McGlynn Jr. as Jeb Marks 
 John Gough as Lige Turney

References

Bibliography
 Munden, Kenneth White. The American Film Institute Catalog of Motion Pictures Produced in the United States, Part 1. University of California Press, 1997.

External links

1927 films
1927 drama films
Silent American drama films
Films directed by James Leo Meehan
American silent feature films
1920s English-language films
American black-and-white films
Film Booking Offices of America films
Films set in Kentucky
1920s American films